The 2016–17 National Ringette League season for the sport of ringette was the 13th season of the National Ringette League and began on October 2, 2016 and ended on April 1, 2017. 

The Cambridge Turbos won the championship final, setting a league record for having won six national titles, more than any other team in the league's history.

Teams 
A New team joined the 2016–17 season.
Manitoba Intact

Regular Seasons 
For East division red teams, they play three games each to same color and two games each to white color teams.

For East division white teams, they play four games to one same color team and two games each to rest of same color teams. They also play two games each to red color teams.

For West division team, they play six games each to same division teams.

The number of home games and that of away games may not be the same.

NRL Community Outreach Program match

Standings 
d indicates clinches the Division and the Championship (Elite Eight)
x indicates clinches the playoff
y indicates clinches the Conference and the Championship (Elite Eight)

East Conference

West Conference

Playoffs 

 Richmond Hill, Ottawa, Waterloo, Edmonton and Black Gold wins the knockout stage and advance to Elite Eight.
 The first place Atlantic advance to the final while second place Cambridge advance to the semifinal.
 Waterloo win the tiebreak mini-game against Richmond Hill and advance to the semifinal.
 Cambridge beat the Waterloo and advance to the final.
 Cambridge beat the Atlantic to win their sixth title.

Awards 
MVP: Shaundra Bruvall (CGY)

Stats 
Regular season
 Player expect goalie
 Goal
 East Chantal St-Laurent (58, GAT)
 West Shaundra Bruvall (43, CGY)
 Assist
 East Julie Blanchette (50, MTL)
 West Shaundra Bruvall (37, CGY)
 Point
 East Julie Blanchette (91, MTL)
 West Shaundra Bruvall (80, CGY)
Goalie
Saving %
East Halli Berry (.910, RH) 
West Bobbi Mattson (.905, CGY)
Goals against average
East Halli Berry (3.10, RH)  
West Breanna Beck (3.35, EDM)
Win
East Emily Ferguson and Karine Doiron. (14, WAT and ATL respectively) 
West Bobbi Mattson (11, CGY)
Playoff

References 

National Ringette League
Ringette
Ringette competitions